Harold Boas OBE (27 September 1883 – 17 September 1980) was a town planner and architect in Western Australia. Boas designed many public buildings in and around Perth and was an influential Jewish community leader. He served as an elected member of the Perth City Council on three separate occasions, presided over the Metropolitan Town Planning Commission and was the foundation president of the Town Planning Institute of Western Australia.

Biography

Early life
Boas was born on 27 September 1883 in Adelaide, South Australia, the third son of noted Minister and Rabbi, Abraham Tobias Boas (1842–1923) and his wife Elizabeth, née Solomon. After being educated at Whinham College and Prince Alfred College he was apprenticed to architect Edward Davies between 1899 and 1904 and later studied at the South Australian School of Mines and Industries.

Move to Perth
In June 1905 he moved to Perth where he initially joined architects M. F. Cavanagh & Austin Bastow and later Oldham, Boas, Ednie-Brown & Partners with whom he stayed for many years.

On 29 March 1911 Boas married Sadie ("Sarah") Cohen at the Brisbane Street Synagogue in Perth.

Architecture
With his partners, Boas designed many public and private buildings around Perth including the open-aired King's Picture Theatre (1905), the Nedlands Park Hotel (1907), Radio station 6WF (1924), Edith Dircksey Cowan Memorial (1934), the Emu Brewery (1938), the Adelphi Hotel, London Court (1937) and the Gledden Building (1938).

Public life
Boas served on the Perth City Council during 1914–16, 1926–42 and 1944, representing the South Ward. He was chairman of the State government's Metropolitan Town Planning Commission from 1928 to 1930 and was a member of the Town Planning Association of Western Australia from 1914. Boas chaired the City of Perth's town planning committee in 1930–33 and 1938–42, and was foundation president of the Town Planning Institute of Western Australia in 1931. He was an inaugural member of the State division of the Town Planning Institute of Australia.

In 1932 Boas stood unsuccessfully for the Western Australian Legislative Council as an anti-secessionist candidate during the debate prior to the 1933 secession referendum.

He founded and edited the Australian Jewish Outlook, a short lived anti-Zionist monthly, in May 1947. However, the periodical went out of circulation after little more than a year as Boas had overestimated the level of support for it.

He was president of the local branch of the United Nations Association, representing Australia and the Executive Council of Australian Jewry at the United Nations conference in Bangkok in 1950.

Later life
In 1969 he was awarded an OBE in 1969 for service to town planning and to the Jewish community in Perth.

Boas died at Subiaco on 17 September 1980.

Honours
The Harold Boas Gardens in West Perth (formerly known as "Delhi Square" up to 1975–76) are named in his honour.

References

Further reading

1883 births
1980 deaths
Australian Jews
Australian people of Dutch-Jewish descent
Architects from Western Australia
People from Perth, Western Australia
People educated at Prince Alfred College
Jewish anti-Zionism in Oceania
Anti-Zionism in Australia